Doly Begum is a Canadian politician, who was elected to the Legislative Assembly of Ontario in the 2018 provincial election. She represents the riding of Scarborough Southwest as a member of the Ontario New Democratic Party. At 29, Doly Begum was the youngest New Democrat among the party's caucus and is the first Bangladeshi-Canadian to be elected to a legislative body in Canada.

Begum was born in the Moulvibazar District of Bangladesh. She immigrated to Canada as a child with her family, and attended Gordon A. Brown Middle School and W. A. Porter Collegiate Institute. Thereafter, she obtained a Bachelor of Arts from the University of Toronto in political science, and a Master of Arts in development, administration and planning from University College London. Prior to her candidacy, she was Co-Chair of the Scarborough Health Coalition, Vice-Chair of Warden Woods Community Centre, a research analyst at the Society of Energy Professionals, and was the chief coordinator of the province-wide Keep Hydro Public campaign.

As of February 2021, she is the Official Opposition Critic for Citizenship, Foreign Credentials and Immigration Services. Prior to that, she was the Deputy Opposition Whip from August 2019 to February 2021, the Critic for Early Learning and Childcare from August 2018 to February 2021 and a Member of the Standing Committee on Social Policy from July 2018 to October 2019. Her critic portfolio changed to Immigration Services, and International Credentials following the 2022 Ontario general election.

Begum stood in solidarity with Bangladeshi Canadians protesting the communal violence against Hindus during Durga Puja in 2021.

On July 13, 2022 Begum was named Deputy Leader of the Ontario New Democratic Party alongside Sol Mamakwa.

Election results

References

External links

Ontario New Democratic Party MPPs
21st-century Canadian politicians
21st-century Canadian women politicians
Living people
Women MPPs in Ontario
People from Scarborough, Toronto
Politicians from Toronto
Bangladeshi emigrants to Canada
People from Moulvibazar District
21st-century Bengalis
Year of birth missing (living people)